The term masher may refer to one of the following:

 A cooking utensil (i.e. Potato masher)
 A man who makes unwelcome advances, often in public places and typically to women he does not know
 A term for a dandy
 A computer device used to create a Compact Disc (i.e. Disk Masher System)
 A Model 24 grenade

See also

 
 Mash (disambiguation)
 Mashup (disambiguation)
 Mashed (disambiguation)
 Mish Mash (disambiguation)